Handy is a ghost town in Bloom Township, Osborne County, Kansas, United States.

History
Handy was never a ghost town by any stretch of the imagination, but it was a rural post office in a farmhouse - nothing more.  Handy was organized as a post office in 1882. The post office was discontinued in 1889.

References

Former populated places in Osborne County, Kansas
Former populated places in Kansas